Lucio Borghesi (1642–1705) was a Roman Catholic prelate who served as Bishop of Chiusi (1682–1705).

Biography
Lucio Borghesi was born in 1642 in Siena, Italy.

He held the degree of Doctor in utroque iure from the University of Siena. He served as majordomo (Praefectus cubiculi) of Cardinal Innico Caraccioli, the Archbishop of Naples (1667–1675).

On 25 May 1682, Pope Innocent XI appointed him Bishop of Chiusi.
He served as Bishop of Chiusi until his death on 31 Jul 1705.

References

External links and additional sources
 (for Chronology of Bishops) 
 (for Chronology of Bishops) 

17th-century Italian Roman Catholic bishops
18th-century Italian Roman Catholic bishops
Bishops appointed by Pope Innocent XI
1642 births
1705 deaths
Bishops of Chiusi
People from Siena